Shàngzhuāng may refer to the following locations in China:

Towns
 Shangzhuang, Beijing (上庄镇), in Haidian District, Beijing
 Shangzhuang, Shijiazhuang (上庄镇), in Luquan District, Shijiazhuang, Hebei

Townships
 Shangzhuang Township, Laiyuan County (上庄乡), Hebei
 Shangzhuang Township, Ruzhou (尚庄乡), Henan
 Shangzhuang Township, Xinye County (上庄乡), Henan